Berndtsson or Berntsson is a Swedish surname that may refer to
Berndtsson
Bengt Berndtsson (1933–2015), Swedish football winger
Berndt Berndtsson, Swedish sprint canoer 
Bo Berndtsson (born 1950), Swedish mathematician
Karl Berndtsson (1892–1943), Swedish chess player
Peter Berndtsson (born 1965), Swedish ice hockey centre

Berntsson
Åke Berntsson (1934–2016), Swedish rower
Alexander Berntsson (born 1996), Swedish football player
Billy Berntsson (born 1984), Swedish football player
Johnie Berntsson (born 1972), Swedish sailor 
Kristoffer Berntsson (born 1982), Swedish figure skater
Lena Berntsson (born 1978), Swedish athlete
Stig Berntsson (1930–2011), Swedish sports shooter

See also
Berntson

Swedish-language surnames